Van Wyck (pronounced Van Wick) is an Americanized variant of the Dutch name Van Wijk. It can refer to:

Buildings
 Van Wyck Homestead Museum, in the Town of Fishkill, New York
 Van Wyck Junior High School, an intermediate school in Hopewell Junction, New York
 Van Wyck Hospital, in Queens, New York

Places
 Van Wyck, South Carolina
 Van Wyck, Washington
 Van Wyck Mountain, in the Catskill Mountains of New York

Transportation
 Van Wyck Avenue (LIRR station), an alternate name for the Dunton Long Island Rail Road station in Queens, New York
 Van Wyck Boulevard (IND Queens Boulevard Line), former alternate name for the Briarwood (IND Queens Boulevard Line) subway station in New York City
 Van Wyck Expressway, also known as Interstate 678, an interstate highway spur route in New York City
 Jamaica–Van Wyck station, New York City subway

People with the surname
 Van Wyck Brooks (1886–1963), American writer and historian
 F. Van Wyck Mason (1901–1978), American historian and novelist
 Anthony Van Wyck (1822–1900), Wisconsin politician
 Augustus Van Wyck (1850–1922), New York lawyer and politician
 Charles Van Wyck (1824–1895), United States Senator from Nebraska
 Pierre C. Van Wyck (1778–1827), NY District Attorney
 Robert Anderson Van Wyck (1849–1918), the first mayor of New York City after consolidation in 1898
 Warren Van Wyck (born 1952), American politician
 Wilfrid Van Wyck (1904–1983), British businessman
 William W. Van Wyck (1777–1840), American politician

See also